This is a list of footballers who have played for Sheffield Wednesday F.C. in 
competitive fixtures. Appearance and goal statistics are for all competitions.

For current players see Current squad.

References

Sheffield Wednesday
 
Players
Association football player non-biographical articles